Daniel Rică Dăncuță (born 28 May 1971) is a Romanian former professional boxer.

Career
Daniel Dăncuță won twice the Romanian National Amateur Boxing Championship at the super heavyweight division in 1990 and 1991. He made his professional debut in 1992 at the age of 21 when he defeated Rudy Gutierrez by unanimous decision in a bout held at the Marriott Hotel from Irvine, California. Through his career he fought against Larry Donald, Tony Tubbs, James Smith and Jimmy Thunder. His professional career ended in 1995 with 16 wins and 3 defeats, all of his bouts took place in the United States as he had his residence in Anaheim, California. During this period, Dăncuță worked for a while as sparring partner for Mike Tyson.

Controversy
In December 2011 Dăncuță was arrested by the DIICOT, being accused of initiating and forming an organized criminal group. The main accusation was that the group was skimming credit cards in Italy, Sweden, Slovenia and Netherlands. On 8 February 2012, the Bucharest Court of Appeal admitted Dăncuță's request for provisional release under judicial control, but only six days later he was arrested again by DIICOT for violating the conditions of his judicial control by going to see the boxing match between Ronald Gavril and Andrejs Loginovs. In 2014 he was convicted by a trial from Bucharest to 3 years and 6 months in prison. For similar crimes he was convicted in Italy (2001), Great Britain (2005, 2007) and Germany (2008).

Professional boxing record

References

External links

1989 Romanian National Championships

1971 births
Living people
Romanian male boxers
Heavyweight boxers
Sportspeople from Bacău